Festuca caprina is a species of grass in the family Poaceae. This species is native to Cape Provinces, Eswatini, Free State, KwaZulu-Natal, Lesotho, Malawi, Northern Provinces, Tanzania, Zambia, and Zimbabwe.

References

caprina